Monotes lutambensis is a species of flowering plant in the family Dipterocarpaceae endemic to Tanzania.

References

Dipterocarpaceae
Flora of Tanzania
Trees of Africa
Endangered plants
Plants described in 1989
Taxonomy articles created by Polbot